Dadang Hawari (16 June 1940 – 3 December 2020) was an Indonesian psychiatrist.

Biography
He was well known for his ability to combine a medical approach with a religious approach within an Islamic framework.

Hawari died from COVID-19 on 3 December 2020, at the age of 80, during the COVID-19 pandemic in Indonesia.

References

1940 births
2020 deaths
Indonesian psychiatrists
Deaths from the COVID-19 pandemic in Indonesia